North Eugene Alternative High School is a public alternative high school in Eugene, Oregon, United States. It is located on the campus of North Eugene High School.

Academics
In 2008, 54% of the school's seniors received their high school diploma. Of 37 students, 20 graduated, 7 dropped out, 2 received a modified diploma, and 8 are still in high school.

References

High schools in Lane County, Oregon
Alternative schools in Oregon
Public high schools in Oregon